Ashley is a village and civil parish in Cheshire, England. At the 2001 census, it had a population of 261.  The village is close to the border with Greater Manchester, just to the south of the M56 motorway and Manchester Airport. Neighbouring villages include Hale, Rostherne and Mobberley. There is a public house, The Greyhound Inn.

The Brereton family were Lords of the Manor  of Ashley for several generations, from the reign of Henry VIII  to about 1660.

Ashley Cricket Club was founded in 1888.

Notable residents
Sir John Brereton (1576–1629) – King's serjeant-at-law at the Bar of Ireland
 Craig Charles – Red Dwarf, Coronation Street and BBC Radio 6
 Humphrey Mainprice – cricketer

See also

 Ashley railway station
 Listed buildings in Ashley, Cheshire
 Ashley Hall
 St Elizabeth's Church, Ashley

References

External links

 Ashley village website
 

Villages in Cheshire
Civil parishes in Cheshire